Kongdech Natenee (born 29 May 1975) is a Thai sprinter. He competed in the 4 × 100 metres relay at the 1996 Summer Olympics and the 2000 Summer Olympics.

References

1975 births
Living people
Athletes (track and field) at the 1996 Summer Olympics
Athletes (track and field) at the 2000 Summer Olympics
Kongdech Natenee
Kongdech Natenee
Southeast Asian Games medalists in athletics
Place of birth missing (living people)
Kongdech Natenee
Kongdech Natenee
Competitors at the 2001 Southeast Asian Games
Kongdech Natenee
Kongdech Natenee